Telford's shrew (Crocidura telfordi) is a species of mammal in the family Soricidae. It is endemic to Tanzania.  Its natural habitat is subtropical or tropical moist montane forests.

References
Hutterer, R. 2004.  Crocidura telfordi.   2006 IUCN Red List of Threatened Species.   Downloaded on 30 July 2007.

Telford's shrew
Mammals of Tanzania
Endemic fauna of Tanzania
Telford's shrew
Taxonomy articles created by Polbot